Rockmelons, often referred to as the Rockies, were an Australian pop/dance/R&B group formed in 1983 in Sydney. Primary members are Bryon Jones, his brother Jonathon Jones and Raymond Medhurst. They had two Australian top five hit singles in the early 1990s with "Ain't No Sunshine" and "That Word (L.O.V.E.)", both sung by Deni Hines. The associated album, Form 1 Planet, peaked at number 3 on the ARIA albums chart in 1992, and was certified platinum in Australia.

Career

1983–1986: Formation and early singles
The group concept was formed in 1983 at a warehouse party in Sydney when Raymond Medhurst (keyboards) wanted a band to perform for a private party. He contacted the Jones brothers Bryon (keyboards, bass guitar, backing vocals) and Jonathon (keyboards, guitar, drums) and Medhurst's schoolmate, Vincent Dale (keyboards) to join.

Sandi Chick (lead vocals) and Peter Kennard (guitar, percussion) entered in late 1983 and were followed closely by Geoffrey Stapleton (keyboards, guitar, percussion) (later in GANGgajang) in early 1984. Stapleton had worked with the Jones brothers when they were in Les Ukeleles and No Heavy Lifting by recording their songs. Vocalists Peter Blakeley and John Kenny (known to Stapleton in Adelaide) were brought in and with Stephen Allkins (operated turntables at gigs) made them a ten-piece.

The group's first single, "Time Out (For Serious Fun)", was released on Phantom Records on 4 February 1985 with lead vocals by Chick. A second single, "Sweat It Out" was released in September of the same year with vocals by Blakeley. Chick and Stapleton left that year.

1987–1990: Tales of the City
1987 saw the arrival of Mary Azzopardi (backing vocals) and Wendy Matthews (vocals). The pattern of using different vocalists continued during the recording of their debut album. In June 1987, the group released "Rhymes", a cover of a 1974 song by Al Green with vocals by John Kenny. In November 1987, the group released "New Groove", which was followed by "What's It Gonna Be" in February 1988. All three singles peaked inside the Australian top 50. The album Tales of the City was released in May 1988 and peaked at number 9 on the Australian charts. Three further singles were released from the album in 1988.

At the ARIA Music Awards of 1989, Rockmelons shared the ARIA Award for Breakthrough Artist – Album with 1927's album ...ish. The album peaked at number 6 on the Australian charts.

By 1990 the Rockmelons were down to Medhurst and the Jones brothers after all others including founding member Dale had left.

1991–2000: Form 1 Planet
In 1991, Rockmelons recruited vocalist Deni Hines and recorded their cover of Bill Withers' "Ain't No Sunshine", which reached number 5 in Australia in January 1992, and was certified gold. Their follow-up single "That Word (L.O.V.E.)" (written by B. Jones, J. Jones, Medhurst and Robin Smith) reached number 4 in Australia, and was also certified gold. By 1992, Doug Williams had joined as a vocalist whilst Hines left to have success as a solo artist, with the "It's Alright" single (1995) peaking at #4 in Australia. Rockmelons were nominated for ARIA Album of the Year award in 1993 for Form 1 Planet, which peaked at number 3 in Australia in August 1992 and was certified platinum by ARIA.

2001–2005: Rockies 3
Rockmelons' third album, Rockies 3 was released in October 2002. Rockmelons used eight different vocalists on the album. The Jeremy Gregory lead single "All I Want Is You" was nominated for 2003 APRA Most Performed Dance Work. Other vocalist were: Roxane LeBrasse, Darren Paul, Doug Williams, Emma Morton, Sydney Bouchaniche, and Evelyn Rubuen.

Producers
Collectively, the trio of Medhurst, B. Jones and J. Jones (as Rockmelons) have produced (or co-produced): Time of Our Lives for Marcia Hines, "Hook Me Up" and "Let it Whip" for CDB, No Commandments for Kaylan, and two tracks for Disco Montego for Disco Montego (aka Kaylan). The Rockmelons have also produced music for Sophie Monk.

Bryon Jones, also known as Bry Jones, has worked as a producer for artists, especially Australian Idol contestants including Guy Sebastian, Shannon Noll, Anthony Callea, Casey Donovan, Jessica Mauboy, Damien Leith, Kate DeAraugo, Stan Walker, and Wes Carr. He has also produced The Voice artists Rachael Leahcar, Harrison Craig, and Fatai; and The X Factor artist Jason Owen. Bryon also produced the music and soundtrack for the Australian movie The Sapphires, featuring Jessica Mauboy.

Jonathon Jones remixed "Love & Glory" for Tina Harrod.

Discography

Studio albums

Compilation albums

Singles

Awards and nominations

ARIA Music Awards
The ARIA Music Awards is an annual awards ceremony that recognises excellence, innovation, and achievement across all genres of Australian music.

|-
| 1989 || Tales of the City || ARIA Award for Breakthrough Artist – Album || 
|-
| 1995 || "Stronger Together" || ARIA Award for Best Dance Release || 
|-

References

External links
Rockmelons archived from the original on 15 April 2002, at HowlSpace by Ed Nimmervoll, retrieved 2 February 2014.

ARIA Award winners
Musical groups from Sydney
Australian electronic dance music groups
Australian pop music groups